In immunology, an immunological synapse (or immune synapse) is the interface between an antigen-presenting cell or target cell and a lymphocyte such as a T/B cell or Natural Killer cell. The interface was originally named after the neuronal synapse, with which it shares the main structural pattern. An immunological synapse consists of molecules involved in T cell activation, which compose typical patterns—activation clusters. Immunological synapses are the subject of much ongoing research.

Structure and function

The immune synapse is also known as the supramolecular activation cluster or SMAC. This structure is composed of concentric rings each containing segregated clusters of proteins—often referred to as the bull’s-eye model of the immunological synapse:
 c-SMAC (central-SMAC) composed of the θ isoform of protein kinase C, CD2, CD4, CD8, CD28, Lck, and Fyn.
 p-SMAC (peripheral-SMAC) within which the lymphocyte function-associated antigen-1 (LFA-1) and the cytoskeletal protein talin are clustered.
 d-SMAC (distal-SMAC) enriched in CD43 and CD45 molecules.
New investigations, however, have shown that a "bull’s eye" is not present in all immunological synapses. For example, different patterns appear in the synapse between a T-cell and a dendritic cell.

This complex as a whole is postulated to have several functions including but not limited to:

Regulation of lymphocyte activation
Transfer of peptide-MHC complexes from APCs to lymphocytes
Directing secretion of cytokines or lytic granules
Recent research has proposed a striking parallel between the immunological synapse and the primary cilium based mainly on similar actin rearrangement, orientation of the centrosome towards the structure and involvement of similar transport molecules (such as IFT20, Rab8, Rab11). This structural and functional homology is the topic of ongoing research.

Formation 
The initial interaction occurs between LFA-1 present in the p-SMAC of a T-cell, and non-specific adhesion molecules (such as ICAM-1 or ICAM-2) on a target cell. When bound to a target cell, the T-cell can extend pseudopodia and scan the surface of target cell to find a specific peptide:MHC complex.

The process of formation begins when the T-cell receptor (TCR) binds to the peptide:MHC complex on the antigen-presenting cell and initiates signaling activation through formation of microclusters/lipid rafts. Specific signaling pathways lead to polarization of the T-cell by orienting its centrosome toward the site of the immunological synapse. The symmetric centripetal actin flow is the basis of formation of the p-SNAP ring. The accumulation and polarization of actin is triggered by TCR/CD3 interactions with integrins and small GTPases (such as Rac1 or Cdc42). These interactions activate large multi-molecular complexes (containing WAVE (Scar), HSP300, ABL2, SRA1, and NAP1 and others) to associate with Arp2/3, which directly promotes actin polymerization. As actin is accumulated and reorganized, it promotes clustering of TCRs and integrins. The process thereby upregulates itself via positive feedback.

Some parts of this process may differ in CD4+ and CD8+ cells. For example, synapse formation is quick in CD8+ T cells, because for CD8+ T cells it is fundamental to eliminate the pathogen quickly. In CD4+ T cells, however, the whole process of the immunological synapse formation can take up to 6 hours.

In CD8+ T cells, the synapse formation leads to killing of the target cell via secretion of cytolytic enzymes. CD8+ T lymphocytes contain lytic granules – specialized secretory lysosomes filled with perforin, granzymes, lysosomal hydrolases (for example cathepsins B and D, β-hexosaminidase) and other cytolytic effector proteins. Once these proteins are delivered to the target cell, they induce its apoptosis. The effectivity of killing of the target cell depends on the strength of the TCR signal. Even after receiving weak or short-lived signals, the MTOC polarizes towards the immunological synapse, but in that case the lytic granules are not trafficked and therefore the killing effect is missing or poor.

NK-cell synapse 
NK cells are known to form synapses with cytolytic effect towards the target cell. In the initiation step, NK cell approaches the target cell, either accidentally or intentionally due to the chemotactic signalling. Firstly, the sialyl Lewis X present on the surface of target cell is recognized by CD2 on NK cell. If the KIR receptors of NK cell find their cognate antigen on the surface of target cell, formation of the lytic synapse is inhibited. If such signal is missing, a tight adhesion via LFA1 and MAC1 is promoted and enhanced by additional signals such as CD226-ligand and CD96-CD155 interactions.

Lytic granules are secretory organelles filled with perforin, granzymes and other cytolytic enzymes. After initiation of the cell-cell contact, the lytic granules of NK cells move around the microtubules towards the centrosome, which also relocalizes towards the site of synapse. Then, the contents of lytic granules is released and via vesicles with SNARE proteins transferred to the target cell.

Inhibitory immunological synapse of NK cells

When an NK cell encounters a self cell, it forms a so-called inhibitory immunological synapse to prevent unwanted cytolysis of target cell. In this process, the killer-cell immunoglobulin-like receptors (KIRs) containing long cytoplasmic tails with immunoreceptor tyrosine-based inhibitory motifs (ITIMs) are clustered in the site of synapse, bind their ligand on the surface of target cell and form the supramolecular inhibitory cluster (SMIC). SMIC then acts to prevent rearrangement of actin, block the recruitment of activatory receptors to the site of synapse and finally, promote detachment from the target cell. This process is essential in protecting NK cells from killing self cells.

History

Immunological synapses were first discovered by Abraham Kupfer at the National Jewish Medical and Research Center in Denver. Their name was coined by Michael Dustin at NYU who studied them in further detail. Daniel M. Davis and Jack Strominger showed structured immune synapses for a different lymphocyte, the Natural Killer cell, and published this around the same time. Abraham Kupfer first presented his findings during one of the Keystone symposia in 1995, when he showed three-dimensional images of immune cells interacting with one another. Key molecules in the synapse are the T cell receptor and its counterpart the major histocompatibility complex (MHC). Also important are LFA-1, ICAM-1, CD28, and CD80/CD86.

References

External links
 Immunological Synapse - Cell Centered Database

Immune system